The Aubad is a  man-made lake in Tulln on the Danube, Austria. The lake and park are popular summertime resorts for both townspeople and tourists.

References

Lakes of Upper Austria
Parks in Austria
Urban public parks
Tourist attractions in Upper Austria